Nassaria wallacei is a species of sea snail, a marine gastropod mollusk in the family Nassariidae.

Description
The length of the shell attains 58.1 mm.

Distribution
This marine species occurs off Kai Island, Indonesia.

References

 Fraussen K. 2006. Deep water Nassaria (Gastropoda: Buccinidae) from Banda and Arafura Seas. Novapex 7(2–3): 31–46

External links

Nassariidae
Gastropods described in 2006